"Mahou no Kotoba (Would You Marry Me?)" is the fifteenth single by Do As Infinity, released in 2003. Two versions of the single were released, a limited CD+DVD edition and a normal CD edition, each version with a different cover. It was used as the theme song for the 2003 Japanese drama Chocolat. Due to the extremely high popularity and marriage based theme of the A-side track "Mahou no Kotoba (Would You Marry Me?)", the song became one of the most requested wedding songs in Japan.

This song was included in the band's compilation albums Do the A-side.

Track listing
 "Mahou no Kotoba (Would You Marry Me?)"
 "Mellow Amber"
 "Mahou no Kotoba (Would You Marry Me?)" (Instrumental)
 "Mellow Amber" (Instrumental)

Chart positions

External links
 "Mahou no Kotoba: Would You Marry Me?" at Avex Network
 "Mahou no Kotoba: Would You Marry Me?" at Oricon

2003 singles
Do As Infinity songs
Songs written by Dai Nagao
Japanese television drama theme songs
Song recordings produced by Seiji Kameda